The 1939 Detroit Lions season was their tenth in the league. The team failed to improve on their previous season's output of 7–4, winning only six games. They failed to qualify for the playoffs for the fourth consecutive season.

Schedule

Note: Intra-division opponents are in bold text.

Standings

References

External links 
1939 Detroit Lions at Pro Football Reference
1939 Detroit Lions at jt-sw.com
1939 Detroit Lions at The Football Database

Detroit Lions seasons
Detroit Lions
Detroit Lions